Shaheed M. Monsur Ali Medical College, Sirajganj (SMMAMC) (শএমমআমেক) is a public medical school in Bangladesh, established in 2014. It is located at Sirajganj District. The college is affiliated with the Rajshahi Medical University.

It offers 5 year MBBS course and admits ~65 students every year. In the upcoming years it will admit ~100 students every year. The college and hospital extends over an area of 121,406 square metres (30.0 acres) divided by newer and older construction.

History 
       
The college was formed as "Sirajganj Medical College, Sirajganj". Soon, it was renamed to its current title. It was named after Muhammad Mansur Ali, a former renowned Bangladeshi politician who was also a close confidante of Bangabandhu Sheikh Mujibur Rahman (Father of the nation).

In the year 2014–2015, Bangladesh government approved to establish 6 new medical colleges at Sirajganj, Manikganj, Jamalpur, Patuakhali, Tangail and Rangamati with a view to improve the healthcare services throughout the country.

Examination and affiliation
Shaheed M. Monsur Ali Medical College, Sirajganj is affiliated with the Rajshahi Medical University. The students receive their MBBS degrees from the Rajshahi Medical University after completing 5 years of studying and passing the final professional MBBS examination.

This college is directly governed by Bangladesh Medical and Dental Council (BMDC) - an affiliation of the Ministry of Health.

The professional examinations are held under the university and results are given thereby. Internal examinations are also taken on regular intervals namely items, card completions, terms end and regular assessments.

Admissions
Admission for Bangladeshis to the MBBS programmes at all the medical colleges in Bangladesh (government and private) is conducted centrally by the Directorate General of Health Services (DGHS). It administers a written multiple choice question exam simultaneously throughout the country. Candidates are admitted primarily based on their score on this test, although grades at Secondary School Certificate (SSC) and Higher Secondary School Certificate (HSC) level also play a vital part as the examination is very competitive, over ~143,000 students applied for ~4350 public seats in 2022 . As of 2022, the college is allowed to admit ~65 students annually. In the upcoming years it will admit ~100 students every year.

Departments
 Department of Anatomy
 Department of Biochemistry
 Department of Physiology
 Department of Forensic Medicine
 Department of Community Medicine
 Department of Pathology
 Department of Pharmacology
 Department of Microbiology
 Department of Medicine
 Department of Surgery
 Department of Obstetrics and Gynaecology

Clubs, Associations and Extracurricular Activities
 Sandhani (SMMAMC Unit)
 Medicine Club (SMMAMC Unit)
 কল্পতরু, Cultural Club of SMMAMC
 SMMAMC Sports Club

See also
 List of medical colleges in Bangladesh

References

Medical colleges in Bangladesh
Hospitals in Bangladesh
Educational institutions established in 2014
2014 establishments in Bangladesh